Canción de cuna, literally "Cradle song" or "lullaby" in Spanish, may refer to:

 Canción de cuna (play), a 1911 play by Gregorio Martínez Sierra
 Canción de cuna (1941 film), a 1941 Argentine film based on the play
 Canción de cuna (1953 film), a 1953 Mexican film directed by Fernando de Fuentes
 Canción de cuna (1994 film), a 1994 Spanish film directed by José Luis Garci

See also
 Cradle Song (disambiguation)